A Fever Dream is the fourth studio album by English band Everything Everything. Recorded with producer James Ford of Simian Mobile Disco and mixed by Cenzo Townshend, it was released on 18 August 2017 on RCA Records. It peaked at number five on the UK Albums Chart, Everything Everything's joint-highest album charting position. The tracks "Can't Do", "A Fever Dream", "Desire", and "Night of the Long Knives" were released as singles throughout 2017. The album was nominated for the Mercury Prize in 2018, ultimately losing out to Wolf Alice's Visions of a Life.

Recording and production 
A Fever Dream was envisioned as a "companion piece" to Get to Heaven (2015), Everything Everything's previous album. Writing for the album took place while the band toured. Bassist Jeremy Pritchard told Andrew Steel of the Yorkshire Evening Post: "We just wanted to work quicker, stew less, avoid neuroticism. [...] If we mixed the [touring and writing processes] up, we didn't get sick of one or the other." By the end of their tour in September 2016, Everything Everything had built up a collection of demos that they worked to unpack between studios in Manchester and guitarist Alex Robertshaw's flat in London. Robertshaw told music blog The 405's Ken Grand-Pierre on podcast "Exchange" that the writing process had been more collaborative than in the past. While Get to Heaven had tracks written mostly-independently by Robertshaw and vocalist Jonathan Higgs, for A Fever Dream the pair "worked from the ground up."

While the band had worked with David Kosten and Stuart Price on previous albums, they instead hired James Ford to produce A Fever Dream. Pritchard explained that they had wanted to work with him since hearing his work on Arctic Monkeys' 2007 album Favourite Worst Nightmare, which they considered a "perfect sounding rock record." The majority of recording and production was completed in a month.

Robertshaw has stated that the intention was to make the album feel "cohesive," that the music was "all in the same world." He and the rest of the band were inspired by Talk Talk's albums Laughing Stock and Spirit of Eden, which "came from a very experimental place" but which ultimately had a "real sense of place."

Composition

Music 
Speaking to music blog GoldenPlec, Pritchard called previous record Get to Heaven "really brash [...] really hard and fast," and explained that they "felt like [they] had licence to have a degree of humanity and tenderness" for A Fever Dream.

Lyrics 
Everything Everything sought to approach the lyrics for A Fever Dream from a more "human angle," relying less on abstract predictions and more on "relationship fallouts" from global events taking place after 2015. Speaking to NME, lead vocalist and writer Jonathan Higgs explained that his writing sought to investigate both sides of ideological conflicts: "Of course I've got my views and they're the ones you imagine, but it's so much bigger than that[. A]rt's a place to explore these things rather than just churn out the same old shit that everybody knows."

Higgs's lyrics comment on politics both at home and in the United States, particularly on Brexit and on the election of Donald Trump. He told Frank Valish of Under the Radar that he spent vast amounts of time on social news aggregator Reddit: "I was kind of embroiled in the whole culture of it, being online and seeing how many social laws break down in that frontier of internet communication." On some tracks, Higgs says his lyrics are "nailing [the band's] colo[u]rs to the mast." "Big Game" makes use of childish insults directed at Trump, while "Ivory Tower" focuses on the "worst extremes of the divides we've seen erupt," and references the 2016 murder of Jo Cox. Higgs describes "Run the Numbers" as "our pro-Brexit song, despite my personal view," its writing inspired by a Michael Gove interview in which he stated that "people in this country have had enough of experts."

Promotion and release 
The album was announced on 14 June 2017, with lead single "Can't Do" being featured on Annie Mac's BBC Radio 1 show.

A Fever Dream's title comes from the title track. Pritchard told HMV that they "thought it really encapsulated the hazy vibe of the album, the kind of distorted reality," and acknowledge that during production on previous albums they had spent too much time trying to select a name. Its cover art consists of distorted nude photographs of dancers, taken by Paul Phung and manipulated by Joe Mortimer.

Critical reception

A Fever Dream has received acclaim from music critics. At Metacritic, which assigns a normalised rating out of 100 to reviews from mainstream critics, the album has an average score of 81 out of 100, which indicates "universal acclaim" based on 18 reviews.

AllMusic's Marcy Donelson described the album as "confrontational, warped, emotionally and aurally high-contrast, and full of turmoil, but reliable in its infectiousness." Rachel Aroesti of The Guardian wrote that the album is not one to "kick back, relax and bury your head in the sand to – it is as much rock opera as traumatic event – but the band's deep dive into this undercurrent of fear and loathing feels necessary."

In addition to the Mercury Prize nomination, Everything Everything received nominations at the Ivor Novello Awards in the categories of Best Album and Best Song Musically & Lyrically for "Can't Do".

Track listing

Personnel 
Adapted from the A Fever Dream liner notes.

Everything Everything
 Jonathan Higgs – vocals, guitar, keyboards, programming
 Jeremy Pritchard – bass guitar, backing vocals, keyboards
 Alex Robertshaw – guitar, backing vocals, programming, keyboards
 Michael Spearman – drums, percussion, keyboards, backing vocals

Artwork
 Paul Phung – photography
 Joe Mortimer – art direction, graphic design, typography
 Billy Bull – graphic design, typography

Production

 James Ford – production
 Jimmy Robertson – engineering
 Everything Everything – recording, production, additional engineering
 John Davis – mastering
 Cenzo Townshend – mixing
 Archie Carter, Luke Gibbs, Ben McClusky, Rob Sellens, Chris Taylor – recording assistants

Charts

References

Everything Everything albums
Albums produced by James Ford (musician)
RCA Records albums
2017 albums